Khvoresh Rostam-e Jonubi Rural District is in Khvoresh Rostam District of Khalkhal County, Ardabil province, Iran. At the census of 2006, its population was 5,775 in 1,365 households; there were 4,745 inhabitants in 1,335 households the following census of 2011; and in the most recent census of 2016, the population of the rural district was 4,875 in 1,537 households. The largest of its 18 villages was Barandaq, with 1,820 people.

References 

Khalkhal County

Rural Districts of Ardabil Province

Populated places in Ardabil Province

Populated places in Khalkhal County